Lillybrook is an unincorporated community in Raleigh County, West Virginia, United States.

The community's name is an amalgamation of Lilly and Hornbrook, the surnames of two businessmen in the local mining industry.

References

Unincorporated communities in Raleigh County, West Virginia
Unincorporated communities in West Virginia
Coal towns in West Virginia